The following is a list of pipeline accidents in the United States in 1986. It is one of several lists of U.S. pipeline accidents. See also: list of natural gas and oil production accidents in the United States.

Incidents 

This is not a complete list of all pipeline accidents. For natural gas alone, the Pipeline and Hazardous Materials Safety Administration (PHMSA), a United States Department of Transportation agency, has collected data on more than 3,200 accidents deemed serious or significant since 1987.

A "significant incident" results in any of the following consequences:
 Fatality or injury requiring in-patient hospitalization.
 $50,000 or more in total costs, measured in 1984 dollars.
 Liquid releases of five or more barrels (42 US gal/barrel).
 Releases resulting in an unintentional fire or explosion.

PHMSA and the National Transportation Safety Board (NTSB) post-incident data and results of investigations into accidents involving pipelines that carry a variety of products, including natural gas, oil, diesel fuel, gasoline, kerosene, jet fuel, carbon dioxide, and other substances. Occasionally pipelines are re-purposed to carry different products.

The following incidents occurred during 1986:
 1986 On January 31, a 14-inch Sunoco pipeline began leaking gasoline in Mercer County, New Jersey, which then spilled into the Delaware and Raritan Canal. The spilled gasoline exploded and burned along a 2,500 foot portion of the canal. People were evacuated from homes, and a nearby church.
 1986 On February 10, a construction crew cut through a gas pipeline in Lakeland, Florida, resulting in about 175 people being evacuated from mobile homes and businesses for 2 hours. There were no injuries.
 1986 On February 21, near Lancaster, Kentucky, a 30-inch diameter Texas Eastern Transmission Pipeline gas pipeline ruptured due to corrosion. 3 people had serious burns, and 5 others had lesser injuries. External corrosion made worse by difficulties of cathodic protection in rocky soil was the cause. The pipe was manufactured in 1957. A senior vice president for operations and engineering with Texas Eastern Gas Pipeline Co. said tests on the Garrard County line last September showed the line needed immediate replacement. It was the third explosion on the Texas Eastern pipeline system in Kentucky in the previous 10 months, leading the Kentucky PSC to call for pressure reductions on the Texas Eastern system.
 1986 An 8-inch diameter high-pressure petroleum pipeline ruptured in Muskegon County, Michigan on February 22, spilling gasoline into creeks.
 1986 On February 24, a natural gas transmission pipeline split for 40 feet along its longitudinal seam in Case, Arkansas. Examining the pipe after the accident revealed lack of fusion, a known issue with LF-ERW pipe used there. The pipeline has experienced 3 other such seam failures on that pipeline since 1975.
 1986 On March 12, a backhoe snagged a natural gas distribution line in Fort Worth, Texas, causing a break that leaked gas into an unoccupied building. Later, that building exploded, injuring 22 people, destroying the unoccupied building and damaging 40 other buildings. 57 automobiles in the unoccupied building were damaged or destroyed.
 1986 A new water main was being installed in Chicago Heights, Illinois on March 13. While excavating, an active gas service line was snagged. Gas company crews responded to the wrong site, causing delays in getting the leaking gas line shut down. Just as crews finished closing the valve on the leaking line, a nearby house exploded, and began to burn; One of the two persons inside that house was killed, and the other was injured. Two neighboring houses were damaged, and one gas company employee, two construction crew members, and four persons in the general area, were injured by the explosion and subsequent fire. Although gas company personnel arrived on the scene approximately 10 minutes before the explosion and shut off the gas at the meter, neither they nor the contractor's crew had made an effort to warn or evacuate the residents of the house.
 1986 A gravel company endloader ruptured a Lakehead Pipeline crude oil pipeline on April 12 near Elgin, Illinois, spilling about 525,000 gallons of crude, and causing a "geyser" of crude oil.
 1986 A backhoe ruptured an Olympic Pipeline line on May 8, south of Seattle, Washington. About 1,974 barrels of diesel fuel were spilled, with some of it entering the Green River. 
 1986 On May 14, a 6-inch Amoco pipeline, damaged by some type of arcing, leaked about 380 barrels of gasoline in Elmhurst, Illinois. Some of the gasoline fumes exploded in a nearby home, causing serious damage. Concerns about the lack of evacuations were raised later on. There were no injuries reported.
 1986 On June 28, a pipeline ruptured and spilled diesel fuel into Trail Creek in Michigan City, Indiana. The fuel later ignited. Thousands of fish were killed.
 1986 On July 2, an explosion at a Williams Companies pipeline Terminal in Milford, Iowa injured 6 people, with 2 of them dying later on.
 1986 Early on July 8, a Williams Companies petroleum products pipeline ruptured in Mounds View, Minnesota. Gasoline at 1,434 psi sprayed a residential area around 4:20 am local time, then ignited. A woman and her 7-year-old daughter suffered fatal burns, at least two others were injured, and many homes damaged or destroyed. Confusion by the pipeline company led to a delay in shutting down the pipeline. Electrical resistance welded (ERW) seam failure caused the rupture. Prior to this accident, this pipeline, installed in 1957, had 16 seam failures during hydrostatic testing, and 7 seam failures during operations until 1984. In 1984, 16 more seams failed during a hydrostatic test. Problems with cathodic protection were also noted before the 1986 accident. During a hydrostatic test of this pipeline following the accident, 3 ERW seams failed. Studies of available data by OPS staff in early 1988 showed that ERW seams have been involved in 145 service failures in both hazardous liquid and natural gas pipelines since 1970 to early 1988, and that of these failures, all but 2 occurred on pipe manufactured prior to 1970.
 1986 A Southern Natural Gas transmission pipeline failed and burned, in a compressor station, near Prattville, Alabama, on July 12. There were no injuries.
 1986 On July 22, a leak at an underground propane storage facility in Petal, Mississippi exploded, causing a massive fire, injuring 14 people, and forcing 200 people to evacuate. A crater 260 feet in diameter and 37 feet deep was made by the explosion.
 On August 28, two workers checking the inside of a 30-inch gas pipeline were apparently overcome by nitrogen being used to purge that pipeline, in Flemingburg, Kentucky, and died. 6 other workers were injured in that incident. 
 1986 Between 800 and 1200 residents were evacuated in East Chicago, Indiana, after a gasoline tank at a pipeline Terminal ruptured on September 4. 28 people were overcome by gasoline fumes. There was no fire.
 1986 A CENEX 8 inch petroleum products pipeline failed near Billings, Montana on September 4, spilling gasoline, and causing the evacuation of nearby businesses. About 29,400 gallons of gasoline spilled. There was no fire.
 1986 On September 4, a tank failed at a Phillips Petroleum Company facility in East Chicago, Indiana, forcing 800 to 1,200 residents near by to evacuate, and spilling 55,000 barrels of gasoline.
 1986 On September 8, an Amoco gas condensate pipeline failed under the Red River near Dexter, Texas. Fumes from the leaking pipeline sent 14 people to hospitals for treatment.
 1986 On October 7, a 21-inch long crack on a 14-inch Sunoco petroleum products pipeline in King of Prussia, Pennsylvania spilled about 220,000 gallons of gasoline, forcing evacuations, including about 900 students from a middle school. The failure was near a previously repaired area.
 1986 On November 13, a gas transmission pipeline failed near Stinnett, Texas, killing one person. The pipeline has been installed in 1982.
 1986 On December 6 in the early morning hours a 30-inch natural gas pipe line exploded on the north edge of the Ross Barnett Reservoir (Pelahatchie Bay) in Mississippi, near Jackson. There were no casualties. The blast was seen by airline pilots as far away as Houston TX and Nashville TN.
 1986 On December 25, an Amoco pipeline ruptured, and spilled furnace oil into the Des Plaines River near Chicago, Illinois. About 429 barrels of furnace oil were spilled. External corrosion was the cause of the pipeline failure.

References

Lists of pipeline accidents in the United States